Rounding Up the Law is a 1922 American silent Western film directed by Charles R. Seeling and starring Guinn 'Big Boy' Williams, Russell Gordon and Chet Ryan.

The film is preserved by the Library of Congress.

Synopsis
Larry Connell arrives in a border town run by Sheriff Bull Weyman and Branch Doughty. Connell wins the sheriff's ranch at draw poker, but Weyman uses his influence with Judge Hyland to have Larry declared bankrupt. Larry attempts to fight foul with fair, but the sale of his cattle pushes him over the edge. Larry holds up Doughty and subsequently gets arrested, but escapes, intending to blow up the sheriff's office.

Cast
 Guinn 'Big Boy' Williams - Larry Connell
 Patricia Palmer - Doris Hyland
 Chet Ryan- John 'Bull' Weyman
 Russell Gordon - 'Branch' Doughty
 William McCall- Judge Marcus Hyland

DVD release
Rounding Up The Law was released on Region 0 DVD-R by Alpha Video on July 7, 2015.

References

External links
  Rounding Up the Law @ IMDb.com
 lantern slide
 

1922 films
1922 Western (genre) films
American black-and-white films
Films directed by Charles R. Seeling
Silent American Western (genre) films
1920s American films